Eslamabad (also Romanized as Eslāmābād) is a village in Zirrah Rural District, Sadabad District, Dashtestan County, Bushehr Province, Iran. At the 2006 census, its population was 243, in 52 families.

References 

Populated places in Dashtestan County